Pseudorasbora elongata is a species of cyprinid fish found in the Li River and lower reaches of the Yangtze in China.

References

Pseudorasbora
Fish described in 1939